Catocala doerriesi is a moth of the family Erebidae. It is found in north-eastern Russia (Amur, Khavarovsk, Primorye), northern China and Korea.

The wingspan is about 67 mm.

References

External links
Catocala of Asia

Moths described in 1888
doerriesi
Moths of Asia